Nathan Silver is an American independent filmmaker working out of New York City. He released eight consecutive feature films in as many years. His style includes working heavily with his friends and family as actors in his films. He is best known for his films Thirst Street, The Great Pretender and the television series Cutting My Mother.

Early life
Nathan Silver is the son of Cindy Silver, whom often appears as an actress in his films. Silver is of Jewish decent, which his work often explores and comments on. As a teenager he was mostly interested in poetry and playwriting. He went on to major in playwriting at New York University Tisch School of the Arts, where he graduated from in 2005. After college he interned for Richard Foreman at the Ontological-Hysteric Theater.

Career
At the age of 25, Silver directed The Blind, which was shot on 35mm film and had a short festival run. Starting in 2012 he began a prolific period of creation, directing a releasing a film every year until 2019. Exit Elena, Soft in the Head, Uncertain Terms, Stinking Heaven and Actor Martinez were all released at this time and played a festivals both domestic and abroad.

Thirst Street premiered at the Tribeca Film Festival in 2017. with a script co-authored C. Mason Wells, the film stars Lindsay Burdge as an unstable American flight attendant who pursues a French man in Paris after a one night stand. Filmed on location with Sean Price Williams acting as Director of Photography, the film proved to be Silver's biggest success to date. It was released by Samuel Goldwyn Films.

A year later, in 2018, The Great Pretender premiered at Tribeca before being picked up by Factory 25. The black comedy-drama, tells the story of a French theater director (played by Esther Garrel), her ex-boyfriend and two actors playing versions of them in a stage play she is directing.

Personal life

Silver cites the films of Rainer Werner Fassbinder, Douglas Sirk, Nicholas Ray and Pier Paolo Pasolini as major influences.

In June 2022, Silver married New York based dancer and choreographer Nicole Fuentes.

Filmography

References

Living people
Film directors from New York City
American people of Jewish descent
American film directors
Year of birth missing (living people)